The Paraglomerales are a group of exclusively hypogeous (underground) arbuscular mycorrhizal fungi that rarely produce vesicles and reproduce through unpigmented spores. It includes the species Paraglomus brasilianum, Paraglomus laccatum, and Paraglomus occultum.

References 

Glomeromycota
Fungus orders